MS Skania is a fast ropax ferry operated by Unity Line on their Świnoujście-Ystad route. She was built in 1995 by Schichau Seebeckwerft in Bremerhaven, Germany for Superfast Ferries as MS Superfast I. Between 2004 and 2008 she sailed for Grimaldi Lines as MS Eurostar Roma.

Concept and construction

The Superfast I was the first ship built for Attica Group's subsidiary Superfast Ferries for their Adriatic Sea services from Patras to Ancona. She is a sister ship of MS Superfast II.

Service history

1995–2004: Superfast I

The Superfast I entered service on 14 April 1995 on Superfast Ferries' Patras—Ancona route. In March 1998 after the arrival of the Superfast III & Superfast IV, Superfast I, along with her sister MS Superfast II were transferred to a new route Bari – Igoumenitsa – Patras.  In January 2004 the Superfast I was sold to Grimaldi lines, with a delivery date in February of the same year.

2004–2008: Eurostar Roma

Grimaldi Lines took over their new ship on 30 September 2003 and renamed her Eurostar Roma. On 15 March 2004, after a small refit she began on the Civitavecchia – Barcelona route. In March 2008 she was sold to the Polish Steamship Co. with delivery set for May 2008. In April, after the delivery of the new  she was put on Civitavecchia/ Salerno-Palermo- Tunis route for a short time.

2008 onwards: Skania 

On 5 May she was handed over to her new owners, Polish Steamship Co (Unity Line) and renamed Skania. She then sailed to Gdańsk for a refit, in which her aft open deck was enclosed, amongst other upgrades for her new role. On 29 August she was Christened in Szczecin and had public open days for the flowing two days in the port. On 1 September 2008, she started on the over night Świnoujście–Ystad route. On 17 February 2009, the Skania was involved in a collision near Ystad (Sweden).

References

External links

Ships built in Bremen (state)
1995 ships
Superfast I-class fast ropax ferries